A disperser is a one-sided extractor. Where an extractor requires that every event gets the same probability under the uniform distribution and the extracted distribution, only the latter is required for a disperser. So for a disperser, an event  we have:

Definition (Disperser): A -disperser is a function

Graph theory
An (N, M, D, K, e)-disperser is a bipartite graph with N vertices on the left side, each with degree D, and M vertices on the right side, such that every subset of K vertices on the left side is connected to more than (1 − e)M vertices on the right.

An extractor is a related type of graph that guarantees an even stronger property; every (N, M, D, K, e)-extractor is also an (N, M, D, K, e)-disperser.

Other meanings
A disperser is a high-speed mixing device used to disperse or dissolve pigments and other solids into a liquid.

See also
Expander graph

References

Graph families